Melbourne Victory Football Club is an Australian professional association football club based at the Melbourne Rectangular Stadium. The club was formed in 2004.

The list encompasses the honours won by Melbourne Victory, records set by the club, their managers and their players. The player records section itemises the club's leading goalscorers and those who have made most appearances in first-team competitions. It also records the highest transfer fees paid and received by the club. Attendance records at Olympic Park, Docklands Stadium and Melbourne Rectangular Stadium, the club's present home, are also included.

Melbourne Victory have won 7 top-flight titles, and have two Australia Cups. The club's record appearance maker is Leigh Broxham, who has currently made 444 appearances from 2005 to the present day. Archie Thompson is Melbourne Victory's record goalscorer, scoring 97 goals in total.

All figures are correct as of 26 January 2023

Honours and achievements

Domestic
 A-League Men Premiership
Winners (3): 2006–07, 2008–09, 2014–15
Runners-up (3): 2009–10, 2016–17, 2021–22

 A-League Men Championship
Winners (4): 2007, 2009, 2015, 2018
Runners-up (2): 2010, 2017

 Australia Cup
Winners (2): 2015, 2021

 A-League Pre-Season Challenge Cup
Winners (1): 2008

Player records

Appearances
 Most A-League Men appearances: Leigh Broxham, 372
 Most national cup appearances: Leigh Broxham, 27
 Most Asian appearances: Leigh Broxham, 47
 Youngest first-team player: Birkan Kirdar, 16 years, 70 days (against Shanghai SIPG, AFC Champions League group stage, 18 April 2018)
 Oldest first-team player: Kevin Muscat, 37 years, 277 days (against Tianjin TEDA, AFC Champions League group stage, 20 April 2011)
 Most consecutive appearances: Rodrigo Vargas, 54 (from 16 November 2007 to 18 October 2009)

Most appearances

a. Includes the A-League Pre-Season Challenge Cup and Australia Cup
b. Includes goals and appearances (including those as a substitute) in the 2005 Australian Club World Championship Qualifying Tournament.

Goalscorers
 Most league goals in a season: Besart Berisha, 21 goals in the A-League, 2016–17
 Youngest goalscorer: Christopher Cristaldo, 18 years, 67 days (against Perth Glory, A-League, 23 March 2013)
 Oldest goalscorer: Kevin Muscat, 37 years, 256 days (against Tianjin TEDA, AFC Champions League group stage, 20 April 2011)
 Most consecutive goalscoring appearances: Besart Berisha, 6 (from 26 April 2015 to 22 September 2015)

Top goalscorers
Competitive matches only, includes appearances as substitute. Numbers in brackets indicate goals scored.

a. Includes the A-League Pre-Season Challenge Cup and Australia Cup
b. Includes goals and appearances (including those as a substitute) in the 2005 Australian Club World Championship Qualifying Tournament.

Award winners

Joe Marston Medal

Johnny Warren Medal

Transfers

Record transfer fees received

Managerial records

 First full-time manager: Ernie Merrick managed Melbourne Victory from December 2004 to March 2011.
 Longest serving manager: Ernie Merrick –  (21 December 2004 to 13 March 2011)
 Shortest serving manager: Kevin Muscat –  (6 January 2012 – 8 January 2012)
 Shortest serving manager excluding caretaker: Jim Magilton –  (8 January 2012 –  2 April 2012)
 Highest win percentage: Kevin Muscat (caretaker), 100.00%
 Highest win percentage excluding caretaker: Kevin Muscat, 49.07%
 Lowest win percentage: Jim Magilton, 16.67%

Club records

Matches

Firsts
 First match: Adelaide United 0–0 (4–1 pen.) Melbourne Victory, 2005 Australian Club World Championship Qualifying Tournament, 7 May 2005
 First A-League Men match: Sydney FC 1–1 Melbourne Victory, 28 August 2005
 First national cup match: Newcastle Jets 1–1 Melbourne Victory, A-League Pre-Season Challenge Cup, 22 July 2005
 First Asian match: Melbourne Victory 2–0 Chunham Dragons, AFC Champions League group stage, 12 March 2008
 First home match at Olympic Park Stadium: Melbourne Victory 1–0 Perth Glory, A-League Pre-Season Challenge Cup, 30 July 2005
 First home match at Marvel Stadium: Melbourne Victory 1–2 Queensland Roar, A-League, 12 January 2007
 First home match at AAMI Park: Melbourne Victory 0–2 Perth Glory, A-League, 14 August 2010

Record wins
 Record A-League Men win: 6–0 against Adelaide United, Grand Final, 18 February 2007
 Record national cup win:
 6–0 against Tuggeranong United, FFA Cup Round of 16, 16 September 2014
 6–0 against Balmain Tigers, FFA Cup Round of 32, 4 August 2015
 Record Asian win: 5–0 against Bali United, AFC Champions League preliminary round 2, 21 January 2020

Record defeats
 Record A-League Men defeat: 0–7 against Melbourne City, 17 April 2021
 Record national cup defeat: 0–3 against Adelaide United, FFA Cup Round of 16, 23 August 2017
 Record Asian defeat:
 0–4 against Kawasaki Frontale, AFC Champions League group stage, 23 March 2010
 1–5 against Gamba Osaka, AFC Champions League group stage, 1 March 2011
 2–6 against Ulsan Hyundai, AFC Champions League group stage, 4 April 2018
 0–4 against Guangzhou Evergrande, AFC Champions League group stage, 10 April 2019
 0–4 against Daegu FC, AFC Champions League group stage, 8 May 2019

Record consecutive results
 Record consecutive wins: 10, from 5 August 2006 to 8 October 2006
 Record consecutive defeats: 5
 from 7 March 2020 to 3 August 2020
 from 6 May 2021 to 23 May 2021
 Record consecutive matches without a defeat: 13, from 19 March 2022 to 17 May 2022
 Record consecutive league matches without a defeat: 17, from 19 February 2022 to 8 October 2022
 Record consecutive matches without a win: 10, from 15 July 2007 to 21 September 2007
 Record consecutive matches without conceding a goal: 5, from 16 January 2009 to 28 February 2009
 Record consecutive matches without scoring a goal: 4, from 28 October 2005 to 18 November 2005

Goals
 Most A-League Men goals scored in a season: 56 in 27 matches, 2014–15
 Fewest A-League Men goals scored in a season: 26 in 21 matches, 2005–06
 Most A-League Men goals conceded in a season: 45 in 27 matches, 2012–13
 Fewest A-League Men goals conceded in a season: 20 in 21 matches, 2006–07

Points
 Most points in an A-League Men season: 53 in 27 matches, 2014–15
 Fewest points in an A-League Men season: 26 in 21 matches, 2005–06

Attendances
This section applies to attendances at Olympic Park, Docklands Stadium, where Melbourne Victory played their home matches from 2007 to 2021, and AAMI Park, the club's present home.

 Highest attendance at Olympic Park: 18,206 against Sydney FC, A-League, 16 October 2005
 Lowest attendance at Olympic Park: 2,215 against Perth Glory, A-League Pre-Season Challenge Cup, 18 August 2006
 Highest attendance at Docklands Stadium: 55,436 against Adelaide United, A-League Grand Final, 18 February 2007
 Lowest attendance at Docklands Stadium: 3,235 against Western Sydney Wanderers, A-League, 23 April 2021
 Highest attendance at AAMI Park: 29,843 against Sydney FC, A-League Grand Final, 17 May 2015
 Lowest attendance at AAMI Park: 3,424 against Wellington Phoenix, A-League, 24 February 2021

References

External links
 Official website

Melbourne Victory
Records and statistics
Melbourne sport-related lists